Richard Byron may refer to:

Richard Byron, 2nd Baron Byron (1606–1679), English Royalist during the English Civil War
Richard Byron, 12th Baron Byron  (1899–1989), British peer and British Army officer
Richard Byron (Royal Navy officer) (1769–1837), British naval officer
Carlotta (performer) (Richard Byron, born 1943), Australia cabaret performer and television celebrity